VHS is a recording and playing standard for video cassette recorders.

VHS or V/H/S may also stand for:
 HS Produkt VHS, a Croatian bullpup assault rifle
 Virginia Historical Society, Richmond, US
 V/H/S, a 2012 horror film
 V/H/S/2, a 2013 horror film
 V/H/S: Viral, a 2014 horror film
 V/H/S/94, a 2021 horror film
 V/H/S/99, a 2022 horror film
 "VHS", a 2019 song by Thomas Rhett from Center Point Road
 "VHS" (Benjamin Ingrosso and Cherrie song), 2021
 VHS (album), 2015, by X Ambassadors
 VHS protein domain, part of a protein sequence
 Viral hemorrhagic septicemia, an infectious fish disease